Wauchier de Denain (also spelled "Gauchier de Donaing") was a French writer and translator in the langue d'oïl, active at the start of the 13th century. He is most notable for writing the first and second continuations of Chrétien de Troyes' Perceval.

External links 
 List of works by Wauchier de Denain, with preserved manuscripts

13th-century French writers
French male writers
13th-century translators